Mohammed Awol Ibrahim (born 1978 in Wollo) is an Ethiopian runner who specializes in cross-country running. In 2007 he won the Hartford Marathon.

Achievements

External links

1978 births
Living people
Ethiopian male long-distance runners